Socialist Alternative (SAV) is a German Trotskyist organization and the German section of International Socialist Alternative.

The SAV identifies itself as a "revolutionary, socialist organization in the tradition of Marx, Engels, Lenin, Trotsky, Luxemburg and Liebknecht", and it "stands for resistance, solidarity and socialism".

History 

The SAV originated in 1973 as a grouping around the monthly newspaper VORAN ("ahead"). The Voran Group entered the Social Democratic Party (SPD) and its youth wing, Jusos, to promote a revolutionary Marxist platform. Like many leftist groups, the VORAN Group hoped that the economic slowdown of the 1970s would draw workers (especially Social Democrats) to the far left. The group was the German section of the Committee for a Workers' International (CWI), which was led by Ted Grant and the British Militant tendency.

During the early 1980s membership of VORAN grew from fifty to 250 members, according to official sources. The group campaigned against German rearmament, NATO activities and nuclear power plants. The group remained ambivalent about the emergent Green Party, which it regarded as a "middle-class movement." The group also organized a national campaign in support of the British miners' strike, and attempted to radicalize German industrial workers and their unions.

Following German reunification in 1990, the VORAN Group took part in the Antifa movement, which was growing in response to the reemergence of far-right and Neonazi groups. In October 1992, VORAN and other CWI affiliates formed Youth against Racism in Europe (in German "Jugend gegen Rassismus in Europa", JRE).

After long-going debate in the organization, VORAN split from the SPD in 1994, claiming that the party had become too middle-class and bureaucratic. Some members chose to leave VORAN and remain in the SPD. In May 1994 the group was reorganized as Socialist Alternative. In May 2002 the SAV changed its publication's name from VORAN to Solidarität - Sozialistische Zeitung ("Solidarity: Socialist Newspaper"). It helped to organize the campaign Jugend gegen Krieg ("Youth Against War") following the start of the Iraq War.

SAV members became involved in the Labour and Social Justice Electoral List (WASG), following the latter group's split from the SPD in 2005. SAV activists stood as WASG in a number of elections. SAV member Lucy Redler led the WASG list in the 2006 Berlin state election. The WASG participation in this election was controversial, since it competed with the allied Party of Democratic Socialism (PDS).

In 2007 the WASG and the PDS merged to form the Left Party. Many of the SAV's West German members joined the Left Party along with the western-based WASG. In September 2008 the group instructed its Berlin and East German branches to join the Left Party, as well. When Redler applied for membership in the party, it sparked controversy as party leadership member Klaus Ernst objected to her membership and that of several other prominent SAV members since they were vocal critics of the WASG-PDS merger, and she had run in the 2006 Berlin elections against the PDS. The issue of Redler's membership even appeared in the pages of major newspapers, such as Der Spiegel, Die Welt and the Berliner Morgenpost.

In June 2013, Heidrun Dittrich, a Member of the Bundestag for the Left Party, joined Socialist Alternative.

After the CWI split in 2019, SAV held a party congress in which two-thirds of the membership voted to support the CWI Majority. However, most of the SAV's leadership was in the minority and left to form a new group called Sozialistische Organisation Solidarität (Sol) which joined the "Refounded CWI".

References

Political parties established in 1994
Germany
The Left (Germany)
Trotskyist organisations in Germany